Made It may refer to:

"Made It", song by  Infectious Grooves from Groove Family Cyco
"Made It", song by Rich the Kid from The World is Yours
"Made It (Outro)", song by Gucci Mane from album Mr. Davis